William Bainbridge (9 March 1922 – 1966) was an English footballer who played as a forward for Manchester United, Bury and Tranmere Rovers in the Football League.

Born in Gateshead, County Durham, Bainbridge began his career with Ashington, but his career was immediately interrupted by the Second World War. During the war, Bainbridge played for Hartlepools United. His exploits there led to him signing for Manchester United when peace was declared, but, although he scored in a friendly match on his debut, he only made one appearance for the club and signed for Bury in May 1946, losing his place in the United team to Johnny Carey. He spent just over two seasons with Bury and moved to Tranmere Rovers in November 1948 after just two appearances for the Shakers.

It was at Tranmere that Bainbridge made the biggest impact. In six seasons with the Wirral side, Bainbridge played in almost 170 league matches, scoring 63 goals in the process. He died in Chester in 1966 at the age of 44.

References

External links
Profile at StretfordEnd.co.uk
Profile at MUFCInfo.com

1922 births
1966 deaths
Footballers from Gateshead
English footballers
Association football forwards
Ashington A.F.C. players
Hartlepool United F.C. wartime guest players
Manchester United F.C. players
Bury F.C. players
Tranmere Rovers F.C. players
English Football League players
Stafford Rangers F.C. players
Macclesfield Town F.C. players